The 1990 Jello Tennis Classic was a women's tennis tournament played on indoor hard courts in Indianapolis, Indiana in the United States and was part of the Tier IV category of the 1990 WTA Tour. It was the 11th edition of the tournament and ran from November 5 through November 11, 1990. Second-seeded Conchita Martínez won the singles title and earned $27,000 first-prize money.

Finals

Singles
 Conchita Martínez defeated  Leila Meskhi 6–4, 6–2
 It was Martínez' 3rd singles title of the year and the 7th of her career.

Doubles
 Patty Fendick /  Meredith McGrath defeated  Katrina Adams /  Jill Hetherington 6–1, 6–1

References

External links
 ITF tournament edition details
 Tournament draws

Jello Tennis Classic
Virginia Slims of Indianapolis
Jello Tennis Classic
Jello Tennis Classic
Jello Tennis Classic